Girl with Green Eyes (French: La fille aux yeux gris) is a 1945 French drama film directed by Jean Faurez and starring Fernand Ledoux, Paul Bernard and Claude Génia.

The film's sets were designed by the art director René Moulaert.

It recorded admissions in France of 1,796,910.

Cast
 Fernand Ledoux as Le père Christophe
 Paul Bernard as M. Henri
 Claude Génia as L'Airelle
 Line Noro as Mme Renard
 Jean Pâqui as Le docteur Bernier 
 Nicolas Amato 
 Edmond Beauchamp 
 Lucien Blondeau as Le docteur Renard
 René-Jean Chauffard 
 Eddy Debray 
 Nicole Desailly 
 Paul Frankeur 
 Raymond Loyer 
 Albert Montigny 
 Robert Moor 
 Françoise Morhange as Berthe Renard
 Fernand René as Le maire
 Jacques Roussel 
 Hermine Sinclair 
 Henri Valbel

References

Bibliography
 Alain Paucard. La France de Michel Audiard. Age d'homme, 2000.

External links
Girl with Green Eyes at IMDb

1945 films
1940s French-language films
1945 drama films
French drama films
Films directed by Jean Faurez
French black-and-white films
1940s French films